The Five Cents of Lavarede (French:Les cinq sous de Lavarède) may refer to:

 The Five Cents of Lavarede (1913 film)
 The Five Cents of Lavarede (1927 film)
 The Five Cents of Lavarede (1939 film)